Avcılar is a village in the Kurtalan District of Siirt Province in Turkey. The village is populated by Kurds of the Elîkan tribe and had a population of 82 in 2021.

References 

Kurdish settlements in Siirt Province
Villages in Kurtalan District